The 2017–18 Logan Cup was the 24th edition of the Logan Cup, a first-class cricket competition that took place in Zimbabwe. It started on 4 October 2017 and included a new team, the Rising Stars, along with the existing four teams. Mountaineers were the defending champions.

In December 2017, Zimbabwe Cricket postponed all the remaining fixtures scheduled to take place in the tournament. Zimbabwe Cricket were struggling to pay players' salaries for November and December and wanted to upgrade their facilities for the 2018 Cricket World Cup Qualifier, which took place in Zimbabwe in March 2018. Initially, the tournament did not resume after the Cricket World Cup Qualifier, with the final three rounds not being played. However, in April 2018, Zimbabwe Cricket confirmed that the tournament would restart, with the remaining rounds of the competition played during April and May 2018. Mountaineers retained their title, after the final match ended as a draw.

Point table
The following teams competed:

 Champions

Fixtures

Round 1

Round 2

Round 3

Round 4

Round 5

Round 6

Round 7

Round 8

Round 9

Round 10

References

External links
 Series home at ESPN Cricinfo

Logan Cup
Logan Cup
Logan Cup
Logan Cup